Georgia Academy for the Blind (GAB) is a state-operated public school for the blind in Macon, Georgia. The Georgia Department of Education operates the school.

History
Thomas Ridgeway, a former professor and an alumnus of the school, stated that the folklore is that a mother in the Macon area made efforts to establish the school after her daughter survived an epidemic. In 1851 a group of Georgians petitioned the legislature to have the school established. The Georgia Legislature spent $5,000 to establish the school, which opened in 1852.

In the era of de jure educational segregation in the United States, GAB separated its white students from its black students. The school racially integrated circa 1965.

In 1990 there was a study headed by two employees of Gallaudet University that concluded that the Georgia Department of Education should do more to ensure more children were placed at Georgia Academy for the Blind and at the two other state schools for disabled children, Georgia School for the Deaf and Atlanta Area School for the Deaf, as all three were under-utilized.

In 2009 the school's student fund was running out of money.

Student body
In 1990 the school had ages 4-21, with students numbering 170, and with about 33% having disabilities in other aspects. Most of the children lived in school districts which had one or two blind students each, and most of the students did not live in the Atlanta metropolitan area.

Campus
The school has dormitory facilities.

Student body
Its student count ranged to 100 as of 2017. In 2009 it had 130 students with 70 boarders.

Prior to 2015 the school had a pep squad. In 2015 it added a competitive cheerleading squad.

References

Further reading
  - Full text available

External links
 Georgia Academy for the Blind

Schools for the blind in the United States
Macon, Georgia
Public boarding schools in the United States
Boarding schools in Georgia (U.S. state)
Public elementary schools in Georgia (U.S. state)
Public middle schools in Georgia (U.S. state)
Public high schools in Georgia (U.S. state)
Public K-12 schools in the United States